Kadangode  is a panchayat in chowanoor  block of Thrissur district in the state of Kerala, India. The nearest towns are Erumapetty and Kunnamkulam at a distance of 9 km.

References

Villages in Thrissur district